The Bacchus Marsh Express was a weekly newspaper in Victoria, Australia, founded by George Lane, and first published in July 1866. From October 1866, the paper was published by Christopher Crisp and George Lane, with Crisp acting as editor, and Lane as the printer.

The paper later became known as The Bacchus Marsh express and general advertiser for Ballan, Melton, Myrniong, Blackwood, Gisborne, Egerton and Gordon districts after absorbing the Melton and Braybrook Advertiser, the Werribee Advertiser and the Bacchus Marsh Advertiser. The publication ceased when purchased by Fairfax in 1983.

References

External links 
 

Defunct newspapers published in Victoria (Australia)
Publications established in 1866
Publications disestablished in 1983
1866 establishments in Australia
1983 disestablishments in Australia
Newspapers on Trove
Bacchus Marsh